Transocean Air Lines was an airline based in the United States that operated from 1946, when it was established as ONAT (Orvis Nelson Air Transport Company), until its bankruptcy in 1960. It was based in Oakland, California.

History

Transocean founder Orvis Marcus Nelson was an Air Transport Command pilot during World War II. Upon the end of the war in August 1945, he was sent to Okinawa, where he and several other aviators attempted to organize a new Japanese domestic airline with assistance from United Air Lines. United president Pat Patterson was not interested in the proposal, but introduced Nelson to General Douglas MacArthur, who also rejected the proposal. 

Nelson returned to the United States and flew for several months as a United pilot, but was recruited by United management to organize a new airline operation in March 1946. The new airline would fulfill an ATC contract to provide military airlift service between San Francisco and Honolulu using surplus C-54 aircraft. ONAT's first flight operated on March 16, and thereafter the airline carried many American soldiers and sailors home from the South Pacific theater.

ONAT operated as a sole proprietorship until June 1, 1946, when the operation was incorporated as Transocean Air Lines. Several weeks later, TAL was contracted by Philippine Airlines to provide a transpacific DC-4 charter service between the United States and the Philippines, which was for a brief time in 1946 the only commercial flight operating between the United States and East Asia. The service was extended to Shanghai, Bangkok, and Karachi later that year.

Transocean provided personnel for Pak-Air, an airline in the newly formed country of Pakistan, from 1947 to 1949.

In 1948 Transocean began to operate twice weekly service between Caracas and Rome after making a deal with the Venezuelan government. By this time, it operated 16 maintenance bases in Europe and the Pacific region.

The Chinese Nationalist Air Force hired Transocean to ferry 157 Curtis C-46 transport aircraft from California to Shanghai in 1948. Transocean refitted each aircraft with additional fuel tanks to extend its range to 2,600 miles and flew the aircraft to China via Honolulu, Wake Island, Guam, and Okinawa.

The Civil Aeronautics Board charged Transocean with illegally transporting passengers overseas in 1948; Transocean argued that the CAB had no jurisdiction over charter flights, beginning a legal fight which continued into the 1950s. Thereafter, in 1949 and 1950, Transocean received special permission to conduct transatlantic charter flights.

In 1949, the airline was tapped by the Department of the Interior and United Nations to provide air service to the Trust Territory of the Pacific Islands from a base at Guam, using four SA-16 Albatross flying boats for this service. Pan American took over operation of the Trust Territory service upon TAL's bankruptcy.

Transocean assisted in the startup of Air Djibouti in 1949 and was thereafter involved in the startup of Air Jordan. It was one of the operating carriers of the Berlin Airlift and provided around 10% of the US military's airlift requirements for the Korean War.

Transocean provided the initial equipment and crews for Japan Airlines in 1951 (fulfilling a contract originally signed by Northwest Airlines), and in 1952 signed an agreement to provide crews, dispatchers, and instructors to train JAL's local personnel. Transocean also supplied mechanics and instructors to start up JAL's maintenance operation.

In 1952 Transocean entered into a wet lease agreement to operate cargo flights for Scandinavian Airlines.

In 1953 the government of Afghanistan hired Transocean to provide weekly Kabul-Kandahar-Jerusalem-Cairo air service.

Bankruptcy and legacy 
In the 1950s, Transocean attempted to obtain certification to serve Asia through Hawaii and Guam, a market then mainly served by Pan Am and being contested by several other airlines. Transocean's request was denied by the Civil Aeronautics Board in 1955. Thereafter, the company attempted a reorganization with outside financing so that it could procure new aircraft, but by the time CAB approval was obtained in 1959, Transocean was already in dire financial straits.

Transocean declared bankruptcy in 1960. Historians are divided as to the causes of its demise, with some citing government interference with its core business and others citing Nelson's reckless management practices.

A half-century after the airline's demise, nearly 200 of their former employees – and now their children and grandchildren – are members of the Taloa Alumni Association. The Transocean group meets for a reunion every year.

Ernest K. Gann and Slonnie Sloniger worked at Transocean.

Destinations
According to its October 27, 1958 system timetable, Transocean was operating scheduled passenger service with Lockheed Constellation propliners on the following routes:

 Burbank (BUR) – Honolulu (HNL) – operated three days a week round trip
 Oakland (OAK) – Honolulu (HNL) – operated three days a week round trip
 Oakland (OAK) – Burbank (BUR) – Chicago Midway Airport (MDW) – New York Idlewild Airport (IDL, now JFK Airport) – Hartford (BDL) – operated twice a week round trip
 Oakland (OAK) – Honolulu (HNL) – Wake Island (AWK) – Guam (GUM) – Okinawa (OKA) – operated twice a week round trip

Fleet
Aircraft operated by Transocean Air Lines Total: 146 aircraft, of which 68 were DC-4s. In addition, Taloa Academy of Aeronautics had a total of 56 single-engined trainers at its peak.

 8 – Boeing 377 Stratocruiser from 1958–60
 1 – Cessna 170
 1 – Cessna 182
 1 – Cessna T-50 from 1948
 5 – Consolidated PBY Catalina from 1949–58
 2 – Convair CV-340
 16 – Curtis C-46 Commando
 9 – Douglas DC-3
 68 – Douglas DC-4 from 1946–60
 1 – Douglas DC-6B
 4 – Grumman G-44 Widgeon
 1 – Lockheed Model 18 Lodestar
 3 – Lockheed L-749A Constellation from 1958–59
 2 – Lockheed L-1049G Super Constellation from 1958–59
 13 – Martin 2-0-2
 4 – Noorduyn Norseman from 1950–52
 1 – Piper PA-18 Super Cub from 1950–52
 1 – Stinson Reliant from 1950–52

Not all aircraft were used at the same time, see fleet history website

Accidents and incidents
During almost 14 years of continuous airline activity Transocean's total casualties were 90 passengers and 16 crew.

 August 15, 1949: A Transocean Air Lines Douglas C-54A (N79998) ditched 7 mi off Lurga Point, Ireland due to fuel exhaustion after the pilot overflew Shannon Airport, where they were due to refuel, and attempted to return; all 58 passengers and crew were able to escape, but seven passengers and one crew member either drowned or died of exposure. The aircraft was flying from Rome to New York.

 November 5, 1951: Transocean Air Lines Flight 5763, a Martin 2-0-2 (N93039), crashed in fog at Tucumcari Airport, New Mexico, killing one of 29 on board.

 December 30, 1951: Transocean Air Lines Flight 501, a Curtiss C-46 Commando (N68963), crashed near Fairbanks, Alaska due to spatial disorientation caused by pilot error, killing all four passengers and crew on board; the wreckage was found on January 3, 1952.

 March 20, 1953: Transocean Air Lines Flight 942, a Douglas C-54G (N88942, former USAAF 45-623) crashed in a field 12 mi southwest of Alvarado, California killing all 35 passengers and crew on board. The cause was an unexplained loss of control that may have resulted from wing icing.

 July 12, 1953: Transocean Air Lines Flight 512, a Douglas DC-6 (named The Royal Hawaiian), crashed in the Pacific Ocean 344 mi east of Wake Island for reasons unknown, killing all 58 passengers and crew on board.

In popular culture 
The 1954 film The High and the Mighty featured a Transocean airliner, albeit thinly disguised. The Douglas DC-4 (N4665V) used to film the daylight flying sequences and the Honolulu "gate" sequence was a former C-54A-10-DC built as a military transport in 1942 at Long Beach, California, by Douglas Aircraft Company. When the exterior and flying sequences were filmed in November 1953, the airliner was being operated by Oakland, California-based non-scheduled carrier Transocean Airlines (1946–1962), the largest civil aviation operator of converted C-54s in the 1950s, and named The African Queen. Ernest K. Gann wrote the original story while he was flying DC-4s for Transocean over the Hawaii-California routes. The film's fictional airline's name "TOPAC" was painted over the Transocean's red, white and yellow color scheme for filming.

See also 
 List of defunct airlines of the United States

References

External links

Official website of Transocean Air Lines Alumni Association

Airlines established in 1946
Airlines disestablished in 1960
Companies based in Oakland, California
Defunct airlines of the United States
Defunct companies based in California
1946 establishments in California